Greencells Group, based in Saarbrücken, develops, finances and builds solar power plants worldwide. With an installed capacity of more as 2.4 gigawatts, the company is one of the largest solar groups in Europe.

Company

History 
The company was founded by Andreas Hoffmann. After studying systems engineering and law at the Technical University of Kaiserslautern and the University of the Saarland, Hoffmann initially founded an advertising agency, which he sold in 2008. Since some of his employees from the event sector were not taken on by the new owner, Hoffmann looked for a new employer for them. He found what he was looking for at Conergy, one of the largest solar companies in Germany at this time, where the event employees were started to deploy on a solar construction site. That was the beginning of the company Greencells GmbH, which he founded together with Marius Kisauer in 2009. Initially, Greencells only installed solar modules. In 2012, there was a crash and consolidation of the German solar market, which Greencells survived and grew against the market trend. The reason for this was the expansion of its business areas. For example, Greencells entered project development and focused on building large-scale solar plants abroad. To keep up with the strong market growth, Hoffmann and Kisauer founded Greencells Group Holdings, based in Abu Dhabi, with investor group Zahid in 2018.

Products 
Greencells plans, finances and builds solar parks all over the world. The Greencells Group is active in more than 25 countries and now employs more than 300 people. The 151 solar plants installed generate a total output of 2.4 gigawatts. To be able to guarantee the basic power supply with renewables, the company builds so-called hybrid power plants that combine solar energy with wind turbines and storage systems.

Locations 
 Saarbrücken (HQ) 
 Frankfurt, Deutschland
 Greencells CEE S.R.L., Cluj-Napoca, Romania 
 Greencells Middle East – Africa, Abu Dhabi, United Arab Emirates
 Greencells USA Inc., Atlanta, US

Awards 
 Best Issuer SME Green Bonds 2020

External links 
 Website Greencells Group
 Website des Greencells Regio (German)

References 

Solar energy in Germany
Technology companies of Germany
Renewable energy technology companies
2009 establishments in Germany